Liolaemus heliodermis is a species of lizard in the family  Liolaemidae. It is native to Argentina.

References

heliodermis
Reptiles described in 2000
Reptiles of Argentina